A stockade is an architectural element.

Stockade may also refer to:

 a military prison, especially on an army or air force installation
 The Stockade, or The Stockade of Dry Creek, original name of Yatala Labour Prison in South Australia
 Stockade (software), net filtering software
 Stockade (Transformers), a Transformers fictional character
Stockade Hill, Howick, near Auckland
 Stockade Historic District in Schenectady, New York
Stockade railway station or Stockade Botanical Park, in Adelaide
 Stockade (film), a 1971 Australian musical film